Rudes  is a surname. Notable people with the surname include:

 Aleksandra Rudes (born 1930), Soviet mezzo-soprano opera singer
 Blair A. Rudes (1951–2008), American linguist

See also
 Rude (surname)
 Ruder